John Norris (Royal Navy officer) (1670/71–1749) was a Royal Navy Admiral of the Fleet. Admiral Norris may also refer to:

Charles Norris (Royal Navy officer) (1900–1989), British Royal Navy vice admiral
David Norris (Royal Navy officer) (1875–1937), British Royal Navy admiral